Konstantinos "Kostas" Biris (1899–1980) was a Greek architect, city planner and folklorist. He was born in Cairo but grew up in Euboea; he graduated from NTUA in 1921.

Books 
1946, Reconstruction plan for the Capital city
includes a plan for a unified archaeological park, on the areas of Acropolis, Plaka, Dimosiou Simatos and Iera Odos
1957, History of the NTUA
1958, For modern Athens, studies and contests
1960, Arvanites
1966, Athens from the 19th to the 20th century

See also 
 Arvanites

References

External links 
Churches on Psirri

1899 births
1980 deaths
National Technical University of Athens alumni
20th-century Greek architects
Egyptian emigrants to Greece
People from Euboea (regional unit)